C. Gibbs (full name Christian Gibbs) is an American singer and songwriter originally from San Diego, California, now based in Brooklyn, NY.  He was a member of Jim Thirlwell's band Foetus, played guitar in Modern English, fronted the rock trio Morning Glories and pursued a solo career when signing to Atlantic Records for one album in 1999.
In 2006 Christian Gibbs formed the chamber-rock group Lucinda Black Bear.

Discography
 1999 29 Over Me (album) (Atlantic)
 1999 Sincerity's Ground (album) (Earth Music)
 2002 Pinkerman Set (album) (Rubric)
 2005 Parade of Small Horses (album) (Rubric)
 2007 Capo My Heart & Other Bear Songs (album) (Eastern Spurs/Irascible)
 2010 Medicine Bag (album) (Eastern Spurs/Irascible)
 2011 Knives (album) (Eastern Spurs)
 2012 Parody's Pal (EP) (Eastern Spurs)
 2013 Sleep The Machines (album) (Eastern Spurs)
 2015 C.Gibbs Sings Motherwell Johnston (Eastern Spurs)
 2018 He Arrived By Helicopter: The Shiny Hostel (Eastern Spurs)

References

External links
 Official website
 Medicine Bag video

American rock guitarists
American male guitarists
American rock songwriters
American rock singers
Living people
Musicians from San Diego
Singer-songwriters from California
Year of birth missing (living people)
Guitarists from California
American male singer-songwriters